Kentmere is a civil parish in the South Lakeland District of Cumbria, England.  It contains 14 listed buildings that are recorded in the National Heritage List for England.  Of these, one is listed at Grade II*, the middle of the three grades, and the others are at Grade II, the lowest grade.  The parish is in the Lake District National Park and is almost completely rural, the only significant settlement being the village of Kentmere.  Almost all the listed buildings are farmhouses and farm buildings, the others being a tower house a church, and a limekiln.


Key

Buildings

References

Citations

Sources

Lists of listed buildings in Cumbria